Frank D.  Celebrezze I (May 12, 1899 - August 21, 1953) was an Italian-American politician,  judge and former public safety director in Cleveland, Ohio.

Early life

He was born in 1899 to Dorothy (née Marcogiuseppe) and Rocco Cilibrizzi, Italian immigrants in Cleveland. Celebrezze and some of his family spent part of his childhood in his parents' home region of Basilicata, in southern Italy. The family name was Americanized in spelling to Celebrezze after they returned to Cleveland in 1912. His brother Anthony J. Celebrezze was then two years old. One of a total of thirteen children, Celebrezze graduated from St. Ignatius College in Cleveland. (This was later developed as separate campuses for Saint Ignatius High School in Cleveland and John Carroll University in University Heights, Ohio). He earned a Juris Doctor from University of Notre Dame on February 23, 1925.

His brother Anthony later followed him in also becoming an attorney. He was elected several terms as  Mayor of Cleveland, and was appointed to the cabinets of President John F. Kennedy, continuing in office under President Lyndon B. Johnson.

Professional

In the 1930s, Celebrezze served the courts as a Cuyahoga County assistant prosecutor. In 1942, Celebrezze replaced Eliot Ness in the position of city safety director, serving under Cleveland mayors Frank J. Lausche and Thomas A. Burke. in 1947, he was elected as a municipal judge and was re-elected in 1951, serving until his death in 1953.

Personal

Celebrezze married Mary Carmella Delsander, with whom he had six children: Frank D. Celebrezze, Jr., Gerald, Dorothy, Joanne, Monica, and James. Frank Jr. became an attorney and was ultimately elected to the Ohio Supreme Court, where he advanced to serve as Chief Justice. Celebrezze is interred in Holy Cross Cemetery in Brook Park on Cleveland's West Side.

References

1899 births
Notre Dame Law School alumni
1953 deaths
John Carroll University alumni
Ohio state court judges
Cleveland Municipal Court judges
Celebrezze family
20th-century American judges
American people of Italian descent